= Holy Spirit National High School =

Public high school in Quezon City, Philippines

- Paaralang Sekundarya ng Holy Spirit (Filipino)

Location
- Sto. Ireneo St., Doña Juana Extension, Barangay Holy Spirit; Quezon City, Metro Manila; Philippines; 14°41′23″N 121°04′50″E

Information
- Type: Public, National High School
- Motto: Guiding students through Excellence
- Established: 2003
- Principal: Ruby U. De Jesus
- Grades: 7 to 12
- Enrollment: approx. 3000, called as Holysians
- Language: English, Filipino
- Colors: Green and White
- Song: HSNHS School Hymn
- Nickname: Holy Spirit, Annex
- Publication: 'The Covenant' (English) 'Ang Anag-ag' (Tagalog)
- Affiliations: Division of City Schools-Quezon City
- Website: https://www.facebook.com/share/1BNnkECNsw/

Holy Spirit National High School (HSNHS) is a public secondary school located in Barangay Holy Spirit, Quezon City, Philippines. It was established in 2003 as Commonwealth High School–Holy Spirit Annex, a satellite campus of Commonwealth High School serving the Holy Spirit community. In 2008, the school became independent and was renamed Holy Spirit National High School.

== History ==
Holy Spirit National High School was founded because of the need to provide quality and accessible education to students of Barangay Holy Spirit. To deal with the rise of enrollees in Commonwealth High School, the local government came up with the proposal of putting up an annex in the said barangay.
